Negdel ("union, association") is the common term for the agricultural cooperatives in the Mongolian People's Republic. The full name is Khödöö aj akhuin negdel ( = Agricultural association).

History

Early attempts 
The first attempts at agricultural collectivization in the Mongolian People's Republic were made in 1930-32, but failed miserably. Mongolia's livestock population decreased by around a third and the forceful manner in which collectivization was conducted lead to uprisings that could only be quelled with the help of the Soviet Union.

Introduction of the negdel 

New attempts at collectivization were begun with different tactics and another name - the cooperatives in the early 1930s had been called khamtral, i.e. collective, kolkhoz - in the mid-1930s, but initially only on a very small scale: while there were 139 negdels country-wide in 1950, in 1949 ten negdels in Khövsgöl combined had no more than 4,700 animals, with the smallest negdel only owning 43.

Collectivization 

The move towards collectivization gained momentum in the mid-1950s and by 1960, 99.5% of herders had "voluntarily" joined a negdel. The number of negdels was gradually decreased so that in time they became identical to sums both area and population-wise.

Dissolution 

After the dissolution of the Soviet Union and the Mongolian Revolution of 1990, the herds were privatized again and all negdels dissolved. Farms were organized into private companies. The process of privatisation occurred through two phases of reform between 1991 and 1992.

Organization 

A negdel was organized into several brigades that were mostly nomadic. The members of a negdel received wages and were entitled to holidays and pensions. Dependent on the geographical location, herders were allowed to keep 10-15 private animals per family member, but no more than 50-75 per family.

References 

Cooperatives in Mongolia
Agricultural cooperatives